Acacia megacephala is a shrub of the genus Acacia and the subgenus Pulchellae that is endemic to south western Australia.

Description
It blooms from July to September and produces yellow flowers.

Taxonomy
The species was first formally described in 1972 by the botanist Bruce Maslin as a part of the work Studies in the genus Acacia as published in the journal Nuytsia. It was reclassified by Leslie Pedley in 2003 as Racosperma megacephalum then returned to genus Acacia in 2006.

Distribution
It is native to an area in the Mid West regions of Western Australia where it is commonly situated on sandplains growing in sandy or loamy soils. It has a limited range to around Geraldton as a part of in mixed scrub and shrubland communities.

See also
List of Acacia species

References

megacephala
Acacias of Western Australia
Taxa named by Bruce Maslin
Plants described in 1972